Galeandra lacustris is a species of orchid native from southern Venezuela to Bolivia.

References

lacustris
Orchids of South America
Plants described in 1877